Andrew John Tomasic, Sr. (December 10, 1917 – November 27, 2008) was a Major League Baseball (MLB) and National Football League (NFL) player. He was born in Hokendauqua, Pennsylvania, a village located within the boundaries of modern-day Whitehall, Pennsylvania (Lehigh County), and nearby to Allentown (its county seat). A 1942 graduate of Philadelphia's Temple University, Tomasic was the captain of the 1941 football squad and was inducted into the school's Hall of Fame in 1971.

Sports career
Tomasic was drafted by the Pittsburgh Steelers in the 16th round of the 1942 NFL Draft. He was a halfback, defensive back, and return specialist. After making his NFL debut in 1942, Tomasic did not play from 1943 to 1945, as he served in the U.S. Army during World War II. Tomasic returned in 1946 in what would be his final NFL season.

Just before retiring from the NFL, Tomasic had already begun his professional baseball career in the minor leagues (MiLB), with the  Kinston Eagles (Kinston, North Carolina), of the Coastal Plain League. His many “farm circuit” successes earned him a big-league call-up, during the  MLB season. The New York Giants (NL) used Tomasic as a relief pitcher; over the 2 games in which he appeared, his win–loss record was 0–1, with 5 innings pitched, 10 earned runs allowed, striking out 2, while walking 5 batters. Tomasic batted and threw right-handed.

Tomasic died on November 27, 2008, in Allentown, Pennsylvania.

References

External links

Andy Tomasic at Temple University Hall of Fame

1917 births
2008 deaths
American football halfbacks
Pittsburgh Steelers players
Major League Baseball pitchers
Baseball players from Pennsylvania
New York Giants (NL) players
Kinston Eagles players
Trenton Giants players
Jersey City Giants players
Minneapolis Millers (baseball) players
Ottawa Giants players
San Antonio Missions players
Charleston Senators players
United States Army soldiers
Temple Owls baseball players